Soňa Maculová (born 20 May 1987) is a Slovak alpine skier. She competed in five events at the 2006 Winter Olympics.

References

1987 births
Living people
Slovak female alpine skiers
Olympic alpine skiers of Slovakia
Alpine skiers at the 2006 Winter Olympics
People from Krompachy
Sportspeople from the Košice Region